David R. Francis Quadrangle is the historical center of the University of Missouri in Columbia, Missouri. Known as The Quad it is the oldest part of Red Campus and adjacent to Downtown Columbia at the south end of the Avenue of the Columns. At its center are six Ionic columns, all that remains of the original university building Academic Hall. Twelve buildings front the modern quadrangle including the domed main administration building Jesse Hall, the tallest building in Columbia. The Quad was designed and constructed by architect Morris Frederick Bell and his assistant William Lincoln Garver. It is named after Missouri governor David R. Francis. Eighteen structures, including the entire quad and most of Red Campus are listed as the Francis Quadrangle National Historic District. An obelisk, the original tombstone of Thomas Jefferson stands in front of the Chancellor's Residence. It was gifted to the University by Jefferson's descendants in recognition of Missouri's ties to Virginia. In front of Jesse Hall stand markers honoring university president Richard Henry Jesse and Missouri governor David R. Francis. Nearby is another obelisk in memory of Missouri's first U.S. senator David Barton, The Missouri School of Journalism is located at the northeast corner of The Quad, comprising Walter Williams Hall, Neff Hall, Gannet Hall, along with the Reynolds Journalism Institute. To the west, Switzler Hall is the oldest academic building on campus, though the Residence on the Quad, home of the chancellor, is the oldest building overall. The University of Missouri College of Engineering completes the west side. Pickard Hall is currently closed due to radiation contamination from turn of the century experiments. Swallow Hall was recently renovated and houses the Departments of Anthropology, Visual Studies and Ancient Mediterranean Studies.

History

At the genesis of the University of Missouri the only building among a great forest campus was Academic Hall. Constructed by architect Stephen Hills from 1840 to 1843 out of Red Brick and limestone quarried from the bluff of Hinkson Creek,  this was the only academic building of the university for many years. In 1843 a mansion was built next door for the President of the University of Missouri. During the American Civil War, Union troops occupied Academic Hall and burned the ancient forest and parts of the library for firewood. Academic Hall was damaged and the president mansion was burned in 1865. After the war, the University sued the federal government for damages, eventually winning and building the Memorial Gateway on the Avenue of the Columns with the money. A new President's Mansion was built in 1867 and still stands today. The need for expansion after the war necessitated the construction of Scientific Hall, now Switzler Hall in 1872.

The burning of Academic Hall on a cold January night in 1892 ushered in a time of great change for the University.  There was much support in the Missouri Legislature to move the University to Sedalia.  The Governor of Missouri, David R. Francis, sent a telegram to the students of the University assuring them that he would fight to keep the campus in Columbia.  He later traveled to Columbia to address the citizens, faculty, and students.  After calling for a special session of the Missouri Legislature he was able to appropriate $250,000 for the rebuilding.  The University of Missouri was rebuilt in a quad around the columns, with "New Academic Hall" later renamed Jesse Hall on the south, and the Avenue of the Columns on the North.

On October 23, 2010 the quad was featured as the location of an ESPN's College GameDay.  An ESPN record of over 18,000 fans showed up.

Buildings

Geology Building

The Geology Building is the newest stand-alone building on The Quad.

Hill Hall
Hill Hall was built in 1950 and named after former President of The University Albert Ross Hill.

Jesse Hall

Jesse Hall was constructed in 1892 as the "New Academic Hall". It was later renamed after MU president Richard Henry Jesse. The dome rises nine stories above the quad, and is one of the most recognized symbols of MU. It was designed by architect Morris Frederick Bell, and serves as the administrative center for the University of Missouri–Columbia.

Lafferre Hall
The Engineering Building was built in 1892 and lies on the west side of the quad. After a significant donation, the building is now called Lafferre Hall.

Pickard Hall

Pickard Hall was built in 1892 and contained the MU Art and Archaeology Museum until 2013, when it was closed due to latent radiation from experiments dating 1910-1930. It was named after professor of archaeology and art history John Pickard.

Residence on the Quad
The Residence on The Quad was built in 1867 and stands on the East side of the quad. It is the oldest building left standing on campus.  Thomas Jefferson's original tombstone stands between this building and The Columns.  The Residence is intended to be the official home of the University's chancellor.

Sociology

The Sociology building was built in 1892 and stands near the northeast corner of the quad. The building has been renovated and turned into the Donald W. Reynolds Journalism Institute.

Swallow Hall
Swallow Hall was built in 1893 and stands on the southeast corner.  It is named after George Clinton Swallow, Missouri's first state geologist.  Today the building holds the Museum of Anthropology.

Switzler Hall

Switzler Hall was constructed in 1871 as the "Scientific Building". It is the oldest academic building left standing on campus. Switzler Hall is named after curator William Franklin Switzler. One of the notable attractions of Switzler Hall is the bell tower. The bell was given to the University by Major James S. Rollins and is inscribed with the words "Nunc occasion est et tempus," which translated is, "Now is the occasion and the time." The bell rang each hour classes were in session until 1936.

Monuments

The Columns

The Columns that once supported Academic Hall designed by Stephen Hills now stand in the middle of the quad. The Columns are the only remaining part of Academic Hall after it burned on January 9, 1892. In August 1893 the Board of Curators voted to remove the Columns because they thought that they were unsafe and ugly. The Columns were inspected and found that the foundations were sound. Local support for keeping the Columns changed the Board's mind and the vote was reversed in December 1893. Today, The Columns are the second-most photographed landmarks in the state of Missouri, next to the Gateway Arch in St. Louis.

Thomas Jefferson's tombstone
Thomas Jefferson's original tombstone stands on the east side of the quad.  Jefferson's original tombstone was given to Mizzou by his heirs in July 1883 due to Mizzou being the first University founded within Thomas Jefferson's Louisiana Purchase.

The plaque on the gravestone reads "This original marker, placed at the grave of Thomas Jefferson at Monticello, Virginia in 1826, constructed from his own design, was presented July 4, 1883, by the Jefferson heirs to the University of Missouri. First state university to be founded in the Louisiana Territory purchased from France during President Jefferson's administration.  The obelisk, dedicated on this campus at commencement June 4, 1885, commemorates Thomas Jefferson, third president of the United States, whose faith in the future of western America and whose confidence in the people has shaped our national ideals; commemorates the author of the Declaration of Independence and of the Virginia statute for religious freedom, founder of the University of Virginia, fosterer of public education in the United States."

And under these words it reads (the original epitaph)

"Here was buried Thomas Jefferson Author of the Declaration of American Independence of the Statute of Virginia for religious freedom and FATHER of the University of Virginia"

Francis Marker

As tribute to former governor of Missouri, David R. Francis, a statue of stands just northeast of the entrance to Jesse Hall. It is a tradition that before an exam a student will rub his nose to receive an A on the exam. Due to the tradition's popularity the statue's nose has been replaced three times since its dedication.

Barton Marker
A stone marker memorializing Missouri's first senator David Barton stands at the southwest corner of The Quad.

British House of Parliament Stone
A Stone from the House of Parliament stands outside the J-School.

Chinese Lions
Two ancient Chinese lions guard the archway to 9th Street at the northeastern side of The Quad.

Gallery

See also
History of the University of Missouri

References

External links
Francis Quadrangle video

University of Missouri campus
University and college buildings on the National Register of Historic Places in Missouri
Historic districts on the National Register of Historic Places in Missouri
National Register of Historic Places in Boone County, Missouri
National Register of Historic Places in Columbia, Missouri
Tourist attractions in Columbia, Missouri
Architecture in Columbia, Missouri
Landmarks in Columbia, Missouri